Thomas Woodrow Eck (March 29, 1914 – June 21, 1988) was an American football player and coach.  He served as the head coach at the University of Massachusetts Amherst—known as Massachusetts State College until 1947—in 1945 and from 1947 to 1951, compiling a record of 17–23–4. Eck was the head coach when the Redmen, not known as the Minutemen until 1972, transitioned from independent status to their first official football conference, the Yankee Conference, in 1947.

Eck played college football for three years at Colgate University, from which he graduated in 1938.  After coaching high school football in Massachusetts, he served as a special projects officer in the United States Army Air Forces during World War II.  From 1952 to 1955, he coached football at Thornton Academy in Saco, Maine, tallying a mark of 33–4–2 that featured a 24-game winning streak.  His teams at Thornton won two Western Maine Conference titles and two State of Maine Class FFF titles.

Head coaching record

College

See also
 List of college football head coaches with non-consecutive tenure

References

1914 births
1988 deaths
Colgate Raiders football players
UMass Minutemen football coaches
High school football coaches in Maine
United States Army Air Forces personnel of World War II
United States Army Air Forces officers